In mathematical optimization theory, the linear complementarity problem (LCP) arises frequently in computational mechanics and encompasses the well-known quadratic programming as a special case. It was proposed by Cottle and Dantzig in 1968.

Formulation 
Given a real matrix M and vector q, the linear complementarity problem LCP(q, M) seeks vectors z and w which satisfy the following constraints:

  (that is, each component of these two vectors is non-negative)
 

A sufficient condition for existence and uniqueness of a solution to this problem is that M be symmetric positive-definite. If M is such that  has a solution for every q, then M is a Q-matrix. If M is such that  have a unique solution for every q, then M is a P-matrix. Both of these characterizations are sufficient and necessary.

The vector w is a slack variable, and so is generally discarded after z is found. As such, the problem can also be formulated as:

 
 
  (the complementarity condition)

Convex quadratic-minimization: Minimum conditions
Finding a solution to the linear complementarity problem is associated with minimizing the quadratic function

 

subject to the constraints

 
 

These constraints ensure that f is always non-negative. The minimum of f is 0 at z if and only if z solves the linear complementarity problem.

If M is positive definite, any algorithm for solving (strictly) convex QPs can solve the LCP.  Specially designed basis-exchange pivoting algorithms, such as Lemke's algorithm and a variant of the simplex algorithm of Dantzig have been used for decades. Besides having polynomial time complexity, interior-point methods are also effective in practice.

is the same as solving the LCP with

This is because the Karush–Kuhn–Tucker conditions of the QP problem can be written as:

with v the Lagrange multipliers on the non-negativity constraints, λ the multipliers on the inequality constraints, and s the slack variables for the inequality constraints. The fourth condition derives from the complementarity of each group of variables  with its set of KKT vectors (optimal Lagrange multipliers) being . In that case,

 

If the non-negativity constraint on the x is relaxed, the dimensionality of the LCP problem can be reduced to the number of the inequalities, as long as Q is non-singular (which is guaranteed if it is positive definite). The multipliers v are no longer present, and the first KKT conditions can be rewritten as:

 

or:

 

pre-multiplying the two sides by A and subtracting b we obtain:

 

The left side, due to the second KKT condition, is s. Substituting and reordering:

 

Calling now

we have an LCP, due to the relation of complementarity between the slack variables s and their Lagrange multipliers λ. Once we solve it, we may obtain the value of x from λ  through the first KKT condition.

Finally, it is also possible to handle additional equality constraints:

 

It is easy to verify that the M and Q for the LCP system  are now expressed as:

From λ we can now recover the values of both x and the Lagrange multiplier of equalities μ:

In fact, most QP solvers work on the LCP formulation, including the interior point method, principal / complementarity pivoting, and active set methods. LCP problems can be solved also by the criss-cross algorithm, conversely, for linear complementarity problems, the criss-cross algorithm terminates finitely only if the matrix is a sufficient matrix. A sufficient matrix is a generalization both of a positive-definite matrix and of a P-matrix, whose principal minors are each positive.
Such LCPs can be solved when they are formulated abstractly using oriented-matroid theory.

See also 
Complementarity theory
Physics engine Impulse/constraint type physics engines for games use this approach.
Contact dynamics Contact dynamics with the nonsmooth approach.
Bimatrix games can be reduced to a LCP.

Notes

References

Further reading

External links 
 LCPSolve — A simple procedure in GAUSS to solve a linear complementarity problem
 Siconos/Numerics open-source GPL  implementation in C of Lemke's algorithm and other methods to solve LCPs and MLCPs

Linear algebra
Mathematical optimization